Emin Alper (born 13 August 1974 in Karaman, Turkey) is a Turkish filmmaker and historian. His directorial debut, Beyond the Hill won the Caligari Film Prize in the 62nd Berlinale and Best Film at the Asia Pacific Screen Awards. His second feature Frenzy won the Special Jury Prize after premiering in competition at the 72nd Venice International Film Festival.

Life 
During his university years, Emin Alper was an active member of the cinema club at Boğaziçi University, spending most of his time with friends thinking on and discussing about cinema. They would organize seminars with the prominent filmmakers of their time, Nuri Bilge Ceylan and Zeki Demirkubuz. He began writing scripts and film reviews. Together with his friends, he published the film magazine “Görüntü.” It was during his university years that his lifelong love for cinema shaped, persuading him to pursue filmmaking as a career.

After graduating from the university with a degree in Economics, Alper furthered his Academic work, receiving his PhD in Modern Turkish History. Emin Alper subsequently began teaching at the Department of Social Science at Istanbul Technical University. He wrote on cinema and politics at several magazines including Tarih ve Toplum, Birikim, Mesele and Altyazı.

Filmography 
Gaining experience from watching other filmmakers and taking role in their short films, Emin Alper went on to make his first independent short films, The Letter in 2005, and Rıfat in 2006; the latter won Best Short Film at the Bucharest International Film Festival (2008) and the Special Audience Award at the !F Istanbul International Film Festival.

His breakthrough came in 2012, with his directorial debut, Beyond the Hill, “about the repressed violence and projections of a Turkish family on holiday."

Following his first feature, Alper made his second feature, Frenzy (2014), a psycho-social drama/thriller about a society“ brought to heel by its fear of terrorism” in which two brothers — one a paroled convict secretly recruited to ferret out terrorists by examining the contents of trash bins, the other hired to kill stray dogs — are sucked into a whirl of state-sponsored distrust. Frenzy was profoundly timely in its subject matter, loudly echoing the current turmoil of politics in Turkey and the Middle East. Alper says of Frenzy, ‘It shows how the political system turns “little men” into the cogs of its violent mechanism by providing them with authority and the instruments of violence, which in the end turn against them and lead to their destruction.’

Premiering in competition at the 72nd Venice International Film Festival, Frenzy was awarded the Special Jury Prize. The film won the Jury Grand Prize at the 9th Asia Pacific Screen Awards. Both Beyond the Hill and Frenzy were chosen as the Best Turkish Film by the Turkish Critics' Association in 2012 and 2015.

Influences 
At 18, Emin Alper was stirred upon watching Emir Kusturica’s Time of the Gypsies, which made him, in his own words, “aware of the magic of cinema.”  He is influenced by the works of Luchino Visconti, Rainer Werner Fassbinder and Michael Haneke.

The storyline of Ahmet’s relation with the stray dog he adopts is inspired by Thomas Mann’s story A Man and His Dog.

Cinematic style 
Through his analytical background and deep insight to Turkish history, Alper has developed a unique approach and style in filmmaking, gaining him widespread local and international recognition. Both Beyond the Hill (2012) and Frenzy (2015) feature sociological parables; a marked interest of Alper’s.

In an interview at the Venice Film Festival, Alper defines his style as “paranoia and dream versus reality.” Boyd van Hoeij in the Hollywood Reporter mirrors the director’s cinematic signature, writing “Some of these might be subjective point-of-view shots, or dreams, nightmares or hallucinations…since the film’s real world isn’t as clearly defined, with Istanbul really seeming to be in the grip of increasing chaos and paranoia…” Besides blurring the lines between dream and reality, Alper plays with color and texture, creating a sense of psychic claustrophobia, made all the more tangible by the sound work of conceptual Turkish musician Cevdet Erek.

References 

1974 births
Turkish film directors
Living people